Saturnalia was a science fiction comic by Nina Matsumoto, also known as space coyote. It won  in the 2004 Web Cartoonist's Choice Awards. The story is on indefinite hold while Matsumoto is working on her recently published series, Yōkaiden, as well as other projects. There are no plans to continue the story at this time; however if it does then it may be redrawn with the intentions of being published.

Nina has taken down the webcomic and as of 2014, is not available anymore.

Story 

It is the year 2999 CE. Human civilization has colonized other planets and created very realistic androids as servants. Mainstream society is generally content with the status quo; comfortable treating androids as machines, if not a little creeped out by them. But below the surface, a conflict is unfolding: some believe androids should be granted equal rights as independent citizens, deserving freedom from slavery, segregation and abuse, while others believe they are an abomination and a threat; underground vigilante groups have formed on both side of the debate. To some of these people, the conflict is an all-out war.

The story so far: Ellipsis is attacked by a mugger, but succeeds in knocking him out. Sysreq happens across the scene, and as the mugger turns out to be a murder suspect, insists that the uncooperative Ellipsis act as a witness in the investigation, only to find that the Ampersand database has no record of her existence. Her privacy compromised, Ellipsis panics and knocks Sysreq out as well, and drags him to PACER headquarters to get help from Nine. There, Sysreq is restrained until Nine successfully bribes him into becoming a PACER: Sysreq will get credit for any criminals the PACERs catch, thus ensuring his job security, and will receive assistance with his frustrated love life.

The following night, Sysreq is sent on his first assignment, partnered with Ellipsis. They stop a pair of HASL members who have infiltrated an android manufacturing facility, where they (HASL) have been sabotaging androids by contaminating their brains in a way that causes them to commit suicide. The mission is a success; the saboteurs are caught by police, Sysreq is commended for his work, and the PACERs' involvement remains a secret.

On their next mission together, Sysreq and Ellipsis are trying to stop a group of street thugs who have been beating and robbing androids, when they stumble across a badly mutilated android, headless, strung up on a fence and painted with the words "Repent Sinner". More mutilated androids are found in the days that follow. The police consider it a matter of mere vandalism and destruction of property, but the PACERs are horrified by what they see as a killing spree.

That night, Sysreq and Tristan set out to find the perpetrator. Tristan wanders the streets alone, acting as bait; when a woman emerges and attempts to shoot him, Sysreq appears and holds her at gunpoint. She refuses to put down her weapon, explaining that believes mankind is playing God – sinning – by creating living machines in its own image, and that she is taking matters into her own hands to build a future free from evil. She tries to shoot Tristan despite Sysreq’s warnings, but Ellipsis appears from the shadows, disarms her, and renders her unconscious. More PACERs reveal themselves to Sysreq as having been watching the whole time, just in case anything went wrong.

Caret shows up then, and the other PACERs leave her and Sysreq (and the unconscious woman) alone to talk. She offers Sysreq a job with HASL, and explains their motives. Sysreq sympathizes with their beliefs more than those of the PACERs, but he rejects their destructive methods for the respectable police work the PACERs help him accomplish.

Later, at PACER headquarters, Sysreq demands that Nine show some progress on the PACERs' promise to mend his love life; Lan says he will hack into the private entries of Paige’s journal. After Sysreq leaves, Nine puts Ellipsis in charge of mending Sysreq’s love life.

One week later, on the King’s birthday (a public holiday), King Hal gives a rare public address to announce that he will be retiring from his post and seeking an heir to his throne. Sysreq, meanwhile, has the day off, and Ellipsis joins him to discuss his relationship woes.

Setting 
Saturnalia is set in the year 2999 CE in the city of Ampersand, on a planet (not Earth) which was colonized by humans approximately three hundred years previously. Ampersand is a city in the Web kingdom, which is ruled over by King Hal, and which also includes the cities of Sumdumgoi, Samarkan, Terminal, Watertank, and Playbill.

Characters

PACERs

Sysreq Varies 
The protagonist. An oblivious, headstrong police officer obsessed with his ex-girlfriend, Paige.
While having a seemingly unfounded disliking for androids, he is soon forced to work and interact with them when he becomes involved with PACER. He tells Cedilla that he has always wanted to be a Police Officer, but since Paige broke up with him he has found himself pretty lackluster in his work.

Ellipsis 
The introverted PACER who originally brought Sysreq into the PACER world. Timid, defensive and has great difficulty in contradicting the decisions of others, she has been referred to as "Ellipsis the Mouse" by Nine Bucks. She would rather quietly observe than get involved in things and is often neutral. Since Ellipsis has not been contributing a great deal to the team Nine has ordered her to work with Sysreq, an assignment which she finds to be fairly overwhelming. Her parents owned an android repair shop in the city of Terminal, and she is the youngest of seven children. Ellipsis is asexual (though she prefers the term "non-sexual").

Nine Bucks 
The leader of the Ampersand division of PACER. Serious, cool and stern in demeanor, he is very assertive and will not take "No" for an answer. He has a strong sense of honour and justice, and strongly believes that androids deserve the same rights as any living human being. The PACERs follow him with unwavering devotion and obedience. Nine takes pride in his team's abilities and in their appearance, so he will not tolerate bad fashion. He also has a fondness for whips and is not shy in finding a use for them against Sysreq's stubbornness.

Kerberos 
A strange but friendly mechanic, biologist, doctor and hairstylist with an affinity for marine animals. Called 'Kerbie' for short, he never complains and greets every situation with a pleasant and easy-going attitude. Most notable about his appearance is that he has permanently grafted on the tail and wears the furry scalp of his deceased dog, Sniffer, on top of his own head. He still feels sadness and regret over how he might have prevented his friend's death had he only been more attentive, but Kerbie finds comfort in how they'll always be together. He keeps a small trained goldfish as a pet, which is able to live out of water and says "chi".

Cookie 
A chipper and somewhat hyper girl who likes saying random things. She was diagnosed with a plethora of psychological disorders when she was younger and has been dependent on a mental stabilizer ever since. Without it she has no control over her emotions and can fluctuate through intense moods unpredictably and with startling speed. She is aware that the stabilizer forces her to feel happy, so she believes she can relate to androids and their programming.

Feight 
An intelligent girl who was raised in a wealthy household. Girlfriend to Tristan, she fell in love with him under three years prior to the comic's beginning. She is a 'Frankenstein Baby' (Someone who is genetically engineered to be perfect) but hates to be called as such. Her parents would not tolerate flaws and disowned her when they discovered her true feelings for Tristan. She has a pronounced dislike for anyone who speaks badly of androids and android-human relationships and has no trouble in getting straight to the point of any issue. Cool and mature, she can seem cold at times but she's rather soft to those she cares about. Always seen wearing a stylish top-hat.

Tristan 
A recreational-type android that was intended as a friend for Feight and used to be a helper/source of entertainment among her family. He is now her boyfriend, but whether or not he understands love is unknown. He has a very innocent, friendly and helpful personality. His positive nature makes him trustful of the good qualities in others, rather than dwelling over their faults. These traits are what endear him to Feight. Because he's young, he can be hyperactive at times and rather naive. He is the only android member of the Ampersand division of P.A.C.E.R.

Lan Win Nook 
The team's bitter teenage computer hacker and research specialist. Holds a great deal of respect for Nine, and holds the opposite for Sysreq. He was the latest member of the group before Sysreq turned up. He'd been found eating out of their dumpster and was given the opportunity to erase his criminal records in exchange for his skills. It had taken him months to establish a comfortable place amongst the PACERs and he views the newest recruit as a threat, putting it down to "bad vibes". He also has a great amount of hatred towards life and everything in it, most particularly towards cops. He spends most of his time holed away in his room or the computer room, his "comfort zone".

Jonelle 
The holographic humanoid representation of the PACER computer system. Jonelle is presented as a small child that often likes to speak a mixture of French and English. She is very friendly and is not intimidated by physical threats, most likely as she is digitally real, not physical; this fact makes her slightly annoying to Sysreq. She was created by Kerbie and behaves similarly to a Microsoft Word Helper.

Others

Sixième Caret 
The leader of the Paladin Unit, a well funded and secret radical underground group that works for H.A.S.L. (Humans Against Synthetic Life), the arch enemies of PACER. Her group is responsible for many attacks against android factories and people that contribute to the rising android population. She is sly, sexy, and wears shoes that turn into rollerblades. There's a somewhat childish rivalry between her and Nine.

Ricoh and Aficio 
Two HASL members who had infiltrated an android manufacturing facility and were contaminating android "lifeblood", until they were stopped by Sysreq and Ellipsis and arrested.

Verdana Tenpoint Bold 
Sysreq's bubbly best friend from college. They hang out together every day. She loves to talk away and offer advice, often filling in for (and hardly noticing) Sysreq's silent lapses. She acts confident and bossy but she means well and cares for Sysreq. She is a polyandrist and is presently on the lookout for a third husband.

Paige Downe 
Sysreq's ex-girlfriend. Loves fried kangaroo meat. She is a novelist and grows many plants, but is not averse to throwing them at Sysreq. She'd been with him for two years before abruptly ending their relationship for reasons which remain unknown. She can barely tolerate Sysreq when he densely continues to whine at her, usually resorting in hostility to drive him away.

Abby 
An android prostitute from Ampersand. She has a very sweet and sympathetic personality and is worried about the android suicides. She is familiar with Sysreq, although she is hardly tolerated by him. They do not get along well in that she does not seem to take much notice of his utter indifference and often attempts to express her concerns. She appears oddly trustful of this officer who'd rather make fun of her than take her at all seriously.  It is later revealed that this is due to his saving her life at the hands of a gunman.  Sysreq, ironically, was attempting to arrest the criminal for driving through a red light, as opposed to for attempted homicide.

Sergeant Cedilla 
Sysreq's supervisor at the Ampersand PD, could be considered a friend. Seldom seen without a smile. Cheery and optimistic, but rather blunt.

King Hal 
Ruler of the Web kingdom, and inventor of androids. He has lived to be over three hundred years old thanks to life support machines and body part replacements. He uses a breathing apparatus, but his lungs are still capable of functioning for themselves. Despite approaching the end of his long life, he maintains the outward appearance of a young, healthy gentleman. He tries to keep up an optimistic attitude, and is often informal and even playful in his manner of address. He seems to have become senile in his old age though, at time behaving with the naivete of a child or mistaking common objects for something entirely different. While these tendencies are often received as endearing by his second advisor, Riven, it is a frequent source of frustration and concern for his first advisor, Postrophe. It appears he has a great fear of public speaking. He is looking forward to reaching the end of his long life, but also seems to harbour regrets.

Postrophe 
Archduke of the Web kingdom, and first advisor to the King. He has a serious demeanor and a strong sense of duty. He feels the current style of hierarchy is pretty outdated but he does admit to respecting the King's accomplishments. He works diligently to ensure everything is running smoothly and according to schedule. He cares for King Hal's well-being, but expresses outwardly via complaints how the King ought to be more conscientious about his appearance and responsibilities. Ultimately Postrophe is often finding himself somewhat exasperated due to the King's childlike outbursts and sense of play, as well as towards Riven's personality which is more supportive of King Hal's antics.

Riven 
The quirky Peace Ambassador for the Web kingdom, second advisor to the King, and believer in astrology. Riven is a Rar-Win and his race considers King Hal to be something of a god-send; It is not yet known whether they are a separate species or simply a distinct race of humans. Riven is nearly always seen with an amused grin on his face. He is clever mouthed, tends to respond literally and is very supportive of King Hal, offering moral support and random facts to comfort him. Though well amused and good-natured, Riven easily became offended when Postrophe made a remark on the King's current sanity and also acted concerned when he thought King Hal might only think of him as second best. He can foretell events through Rar-Win astrology and enjoys speaking of the subject, though his current claims have yet to come true.

External links 
Saturnalia  at the internet archive
Artist's Blog
OnlineComics.net listing

2000s webcomics
2002 webcomic debuts
2006 webcomic endings
Canadian webcomics
Web Cartoonists' Choice Award winners
Science fiction webcomics
Anime and manga inspired webcomics
Long-form webcomics